Trigger Fingers is a 1939 American Western film directed by Sam Newfield and starring Tim McCoy.

Premise
"Lightning" Bill Carson and his sidekick Magpie go into town with friend Margaret, pose as gypsies and discover a crime ring masterminded by Bert Lee.

Cast
 Tim McCoy as Bill Carson
 Joyce Bryant as Margaret
 Ben Corbett as Magpie
 Carleton Young as Bert Lee

External links
Trigger Fingers at IMDb

1939 films
1939 Western (genre) films
American Western (genre) films
American black-and-white films
Films directed by Sam Newfield
1930s American films